Anthony Briscoe (born 16 August 1978) is a footballer who played as a forward for Shrewsbury Town in The Football League.

He made his debut for the Shrews on 1 February 1997 in the Second Division 2–0 defeat to Bristol Rovers at the Memorial Ground. He came on as a second-half substitute for Nick Ward.

References

External links

1978 births
Living people
Sportspeople from Walsall
English footballers
Association football forwards
Shrewsbury Town F.C. players
Tamworth F.C. players
English Football League players